Mordellistena nepalensis is a species of beetle in the genus Mordellistena of the family Mordellidae. It was described by Jan Horák in 1995.

References

Beetles described in 1995
nepalensis